Ruth Pierce Posselt (Medford, Massachusetts, September 6, 1911 – Gulfport, Florida, February 19, 2007) was an American violinist and educator.

Studies and early career 
Posselt studied violin with Emanuel Ondříček, a former student of Eugène Ysaÿe, and made her Carnegie Hall debut in 1923. She won the Schubert Memorial Prize in 1929, toured France, the Netherlands, Scandinavia, the Soviet Union in the early 1930s and made her first tour of the United States in 1935. She performed with the National Orchestral Association, the National Symphony Orchestra, the Columbia Symphony Orchestra and frequently with the Boston Symphony Orchestra. She was invited to perform at The White House by President and Mrs. Roosevelt in 1937. Posselt toured frequently as a recitalist, and formed a duo with pianist Luise Vosgerchian in 1958.

Premieres 
Posselt performed several world premieres in her career, including Walter Piston's First Violin Concerto, a piece which was written for her, in 1940. (Violin Concerto No. 1) She also premiered a violin concerto by Vladimir Dukelsky, a.k.a. Vernon Duke, with the Boston Symphony Orchestra and conductor Serge Koussevitsky in March 1943. Also with the Boston Symphony Orchestra, Posselt premiered violin concertos by composers Edward Burlingame Hill (Concerto for Violin, Opus 38), in 1939, and Samuel Barber (revised version of Concerto for Violin and Orchestra), in 1949, and played the New York premiere of Paul Hindemith's Violin Concerto in 1941. In 1944, Posselt premiered Aaron Copland's Violin Sonata with the composer at the piano.

She married violinist, concertmaster, and conductor Richard Burgin on July 3, 1940. Their son, Richard W. Burgin, was the author of numerous short-story collections and novels. Their daughter, Diana Lewis Burgin, is an author and professor of Russian at the University of Massachusetts Amherst

From 1958, Posselt performed on a 1732 Giuseppe Guarneri "Del Gesu" known as the "Posselt, Phillip".

Recordings 
BOSTON B-209 LP 195x
  Brahms / Wenzel (Posselt)
DECCA DL 9635  LP 1952
Beethoven Trios – Bel Arte Trio
DECCA DL 9659  LP 1952  /  BRUNSWICK(UK) AXTL 1031
MOZART: Divertimento: for Violin, Viola & Cello
THE BEL ARTE TRIO Ruth Posselt, violin; Joseph DePasquale, viola; Samuel Mayes, 'cello
KAPP KCL 9024  LP / UNICORN UNLP 1030 (reissue).
Italian music for strings of the baroque period.
Cambridge Society for Early Music; Erwin Bodky, director;
Concerto in A major for violin, strings and continuo (The Pisendel-Concerto) / Vivaldi --
Sonata for violin and continuo in B minor, op. 1, no. 3 / Veracini --
Sonata in C major for 2 violins and continuo, op. 3, no. 1 / Dall'Abaco --
Concerto in D minor for violin, strings and continuo / Torelli --
Trio sonata in A major, op. 1, no. 3 for 2 violins and continuo / Albinoni.
COLUMBIA ML 4996  LP 1955 / SONY SMK 60725  CD
Lopatnikoff: Concertino; Dallapiccola: Tartiniana (POSSELT, vln); Shapero: Symphony for Classical Orchestra.

Teaching 
Posselt taught and performed at Florida State University from 1963 to 1978, coming to the school as a visiting artist, continuing her stay as an artist in residence and member of the Florestan String Quartet, with her husband. Posselt eventually became a professor at the University. She also taught privately at Wellesley College and New England Conservatory.

References

Further reading 

American classical violinists
People from Medford, Massachusetts
1911 births
2007 deaths
Florida State University faculty
Wellesley College faculty
New England Conservatory faculty
20th-century classical violinists
Women classical violinists
20th-century women musicians
Classical musicians from Massachusetts
Women music educators
20th-century American violinists